Ibragimovo (İbrahim) is a rural locality (a village) in Starokurmashevsky Selsoviet, Kushnarenkovsky District, Bashkortostan, Russia. The population was 128 as of 2010. There are 2 streets.

Geography 
Ibragimovo is located 18 km southwest of Kushnarenkovo (the district's administrative centre) by road. Novokurmashevo is the nearest rural locality.

References 

Rural localities in Kushnarenkovsky District